The roadrunners (genus Geococcyx), also known as chaparral birds or chaparral cocks, are two species of fast-running ground cuckoos with long tails and crests. They are found in the southwestern and south-central United States and Mexico, usually in the desert. Although capable of flight, roadrunners generally run away from predators.

Species 
The subfamily Neomorphinae, the New World ground cuckoos, includes 11 species of birds, while the genus Geococcyx has just two:

Morphology 

The roadrunner is a large, slender, black-brown and white-streaked ground bird with a distinctive head crest. It has long legs, strong feet, and an oversized dark bill. The tail is broad with white tips on the three outer tail feathers. The bird has a bare patch of skin behind each eye; this patch is shaded blue anterior to red posterior. The lesser roadrunner is slightly smaller, not as streaky, and has a smaller bill. Both the lesser roadrunner and the greater roadrunner leave behind very distinct "X" track marks appearing as if they are travelling in both directions.

Roadrunners and other members of the cuckoo family have zygodactyl feet. During flight, the short, rounded wings reveal a white crescent in the primary feathers.

Vocalization

The roadrunner has a slow and descending dove-like "coo". It also makes a rapid, vocalized clattering sound with its beak.

Geographic range 
Roadrunners inhabit the Southwestern United States, to parts of Missouri, Arkansas, and Louisiana, as well as Mexico and Central America. They live in arid lowland or mountainous shrubland or woodland. They are non-migratory, staying in their breeding area year-round. The greater roadrunner is not currently considered threatened in the US, but is habitat-limited.

Food and foraging habits 

The roadrunner is an opportunistic omnivore. Its diet normally consists of insects (such as grasshoppers, crickets, caterpillars, and beetles), small reptiles (such as lizards and snakes, including rattlesnakes), rodents and other small mammals, spiders (including tarantulas), scorpions, centipedes, snails, small birds (and nestlings), eggs, and fruits and seeds like those from prickly pear cactuses and sumacs. The lesser roadrunner eats mainly insects. The roadrunner forages on the ground and, when hunting, usually runs after prey from under cover. It may leap to catch insects, and commonly batters certain prey against the ground. Because of its quickness, the roadrunner is one of the few animals that preys upon rattlesnakes; it is also the only real predator of tarantula hawk wasps.

Behavior and breeding 

The roadrunner usually lives alone or in pairs. Breeding pairs are monogamous and mate for life, and pairs may hold a territory all year. During the courtship display, the male bows, alternately lifting and dropping his wings and spreading his tail. He parades in front of the female with his head high and his tail and wings drooped, and may bring an offering of food. The reproductive season is spring to mid-summer (depending on geographic location and species).

The roadrunner's nest is often composed of sticks, and may sometimes contain leaves, feathers, snakeskins, or dung. Roadrunner eggs are generally white. The greater roadrunner generally lays 2–6 eggs per clutch, but the lesser roadrunner's clutches are typically smaller. Hatching is asynchronous. Both sexes incubate the nest (with males incubating the nest at night) and feed the hatchlings. For the first one to two weeks after the young hatch, one parent remains at the nest. The young leave the nest at two to three weeks old, foraging with parents for a few days after.

Thermoregulation 

During the cold desert night, the roadrunner lowers its body temperature slightly, going into a slight torpor to conserve energy. To warm itself during the day, the roadrunner exposes dark patches of skin on its back to the sun.

Indigenous lore 

The Hopi and other Pueblo tribes believed that roadrunners were medicine birds and could protect against evil spirits. Their unusual X-shaped footprints are used as sacred symbols to ward off evil in many Pueblo tribes—partially because they invoke the protective power of the roadrunners themselves, and partially because the X shape of the tracks conceals which direction the bird is headed (thus throwing malignant spirits off track.) Stylized roadrunner tracks have been found in the rock art of ancestral Southwestern tribes like the Anasazi and Mogollon cultures, as well. Roadrunner feathers were traditionally used to decorate Pueblo  cradleboards as spiritual protection for the baby. In Mexican Indian and American Indian tribes, such as the Pima, it is considered good luck to see a roadrunner. In some Mexican tribes, the bird was considered sacred and never killed, but most Mexican Indians used the meat of the roadrunner as a folk remedy to cure illness or to boost stamina and strength.

Indigenous peoples of Central America have developed numerous beliefs about the roadrunner. The Ch’orti’, who call it t’unk’u’x or mu’, have taboos against harming the bird. The Ch'ol Maya believe roadrunners to have special powers. It is known to them as ajkumtz’u’, derived from the bird's call that is said to make the listener feel tired.

In media
The roadrunner was made popular by the Warner Bros. cartoon characters Wile E. Coyote and the Road Runner, created in 1949, and the subject of a long-running series of theatrical cartoon shorts. In each episode, the cunning, insidious, and constantly hungry Wile E. Coyote repeatedly attempts to catch and subsequently eat the Road Runner, but is never successful. The cartoons led to a misconception that roadrunners say "meep, meep" because the roadrunner in this cartoon series made that sound instead of the aforementioned sound of a real roadrunner. In some shorts, the Road Runner makes a noise while sticking his tongue out at Wile E. Coyote, which resembles its actual call. The cartoons rely on a misconception that a roadrunner is much faster than a coyote.

Citations

General references

Further reading

External links

Distribution map of the Greater Roadrunner
Greater Roadrunner sounds
Video clips of roadrunners in action

Articles containing video clips
Birds of Mexico